A hotbed is a biological term for an area of decaying organic matter that is warmer than its surroundings. The heat gradient is generated by the decomposition of organic substituents within the pile by microorganism metabolization.

A hotbed covered with a small glass cover (also called a hotbox) is used as a small version of a hothouse (heated greenhouse or cold frame). Oftentimes, this bed is made of manure from animals such as horses, which pass undigested plant cellulose in their droppings, creating a good environment for microorganisms to come and break down the cellulose and create a hotbed. (The digestive systems of ruminants such as cattle and sheep destroy and use all cellulose in their food, and their droppings remain cold and do not heat up.) 

Some egg-laying animals, such as the brush turkey, make or use hotbeds to incubate their eggs.

By extension, the term hotbed is used metaphorically to describe an environment that is ideal for the growth or development of something, especially of something undesirable.

References

Biodegradation
Composting
Ecology
Horticultural techniques
Horticulture